American singer Toni Braxton has recorded songs for her ten studio albums and has collaborated with other artists for duets and featured songs on their respective albums and charity singles.

Released songs

Unreleased songs

References

Braxton, Toni
Lists of